The 2014 All-Ireland Intermediate Hurling Championship was the 31st staging of the All-Ireland hurling championship for players in the intermediate grade since its establishment by the Gaelic Athletic Association in 1961. The championship began on 25 May 2014 and ended on 9 August 2014.

Tipperary were the defending champions, however, they were defeated in the provincial decider. Cork won the title after defeating Wexford by 2-18 to 2-12 in the All-Ireland final.

Team summaries

Results

Leinster Intermediate Hurling Championship

Munster Intermediate Hurling Championship

All-Ireland Intermediate Hurling Championship

Statistics

Top scorers
Overall

Single game

External links
 2014 Leinster Intermediate Hurling Championship fixtures
 2014 Munster Intermediate Hurling Championship fixtures

References

Intermediate
All-Ireland Intermediate Hurling Championship